Martin Edward Trench (November 30, 1869 – January 6, 1927) was a Captain of the United States Navy and Governor of the United States Virgin Islands from 1925 until his death in 1927. He is the first Governor of the territory to have died while in office.

Born the son of an immigrant farmer from Ireland in Dennison, Minnesota, he graduated from the United States Naval Academy in 1893. He first served in the Spanish–American War. During World War I, he commanded . On September 12, 1925, he was sworn in as the Governor of the United States Virgin Islands.

He died in Worcester, Massachusetts while spending the holidays with a friend away from the Islands. He is buried in Arlington National Cemetery outside of Washington, DC.

References
 "New Virgin Islands Governor Sworn In." Associated Press. The Washington Post. Washington, D.C.: Sep 13, 1925. pg. 18, 1 pgs
 "VIRGIN ISLES' GOVERNOR, CAPT. TRENCH, IS DEAD." The Washington Post. Washington, D.C.: Jan 7, 1927. pg. 10, 1 pgs

External links

1869 births
1927 deaths
People from Dennison, Minnesota
United States Naval Academy alumni
Military personnel from Minnesota
Governors of the United States Virgin Islands
United States Navy officers
Burials at Arlington National Cemetery